The 2020–21 season was MŠK Žilina's 113th season in existence and the club's 24th consecutive season in the top flight of Slovak football. In addition to the domestic league, Žilina participated in this season's edition of the  Slovak Cup and the UEFA Europa League.

Current squad

Competitions overview

Slovak First Football League

Regular stage

League table

Results by round

Matches

Championship group

League table

Results by round

Matches

Europa Conference League play-offs

Semi-final

Final

Slovak Cup

Semi-finals

Final

UEFA Europa League

First qualifying round

Notes

References

External links

MŠK Žilina seasons
Žilina
Žilina